Stenophantes martinezi is a species of beetle in the family Cerambycidae. It was described by Cerda in 1980.

References

Cerambycinae
Beetles described in 1980